The Queen Sirikit Dam is an embankment dam on the Nan River, a tributary of the Chao Phraya River, in Tha Pla District, Uttaradit Province, Thailand. It is at the southeastern edge of the Phi Pan Nam Range. The dam was built for the purpose of irrigation, flood control and hydroelectric power production. It is named after Sirikit, Queen of Thailand.

Background
The Sirikit Dam among others in the Chao Phraya basin were constructed beginning in the 1950s to exploit the agricultural and hydroelectric potential of the basin. Preliminary construction on the dam began in 1968 and it was finished in 1972. The power plant and first three units were commissioned in 1974, the fourth in 1995. Previously in 1964, the Bhumibol Dam was completed on the Ping River, one of two major tributaries of the Chao Phraya including the Nan. The Bhumibol and Sirkit Dams control 22% of the Chao Phraya's annual runoff combined.

Design
The dam's power station contains 4 x 125 MW Francis turbines for an installed capacity of 500 MW.

See also

List of power stations in Thailand

References

External links

Sirikit Dam at Electricity Generating Authority of Thailand

Dams in Thailand
Hydroelectric power stations in Thailand
Embankment dams
Buildings and structures in Uttaradit province
Dams completed in 1974
Energy infrastructure completed in 1974
1974 establishments in Thailand
Phi Pan Nam Range